Nia King is a mixed-race of Black/Lebanese/Hungarian descent, queer, art activist, multimedia journalist, podcaster, public speaker, and zine maker. She lives in Oakland, California. Within her podcast, "We Want the Airwaves," Nia interviews queer and trans artists about their lives and about their work. The title of her podcast was inspired from a Ramones song and played as a demand for media access and an insistence on the right for marginalized people to take up space.

Early life 
King graduated from Mills College in 2011. She is originally from Boston, Massachusetts.

Career 
King has created various zines covering topics such as race, self-reflection, and sexuality. About her artwork, King has stated, "I want to be an artist for the movement."  She co-edited the book Queer and Trans Artists of Color: Stories of Some of Our Lives (2014) with Jessica Glennon-Zukoff and Terra Mikalson. This collection was based upon the first year of the podcasts she created, which primarily focuses on experiences of Black and Latin persons. The book includes King's interviews with Ryka Aoki, Van Binfa, Micia Mosely, Yosimar Reyes, Kortney Ryan Ziegler, Lovemme Corazón, Fabian Romero, Magnoliah Black, Kiam Marcelo Junio, Miss Persia and Daddie$ Pla$tik, Virgie Tovar, Julio Salgado, Nick Mwaluko, Leah Lakshmi Piepzna-Samarasinha, and Janet Mock. The Advocate listed this book on its list of the Year's 10 Best Transgender Non-Fiction books in 2014. Her second book, Queer and Trans Artists of Color, Volume 2 is a collection of interviews discussing race, sexuality, and systematic oppression. King self-publishes her own work, and said in an interview with the Barnard Center for Research on Women this was because "my work is not mainstream enough for institutions or organizations to want to resource my work in a meaningful way." Her goal is to share the stories of queer and transgender activists.

King is host and producer of the podcast We Want the Airwaves in which she interviews queer and trans artists of color, such as: Suzy X, Kyle Casey Chu and Gabby Rivera. Nia King said in an interview with KQED Arts that the title of her podcast is "from a Ramones song, which goes back to my punk rock roots. It's also a demand for access to the media and an insistence on the right for marginalized people to take up space." In an interview with Christopher Persaud on Ideas on Fire, Nia discusses how self-publishing is more accessible than traditional publishing to marginalized authors.

King's illustrations are featured in Voices of Mixed Heritage: Crossing Borders, Bridging Generations, a curriculum kit for grades 6–12 published by Brooklyn Historical Society.

Selected works 

 Art School is Hell (2013) 
 Angry black-white girl: Reflections on my mixed race identity 
 MXD zine!: True stories by mixed race writers, a collection of poems and articles about being a mixed race person in the United States 
 Borderlands: Tales from disputed territories between races and cultures, a sequel to MXD zine!
 Borderlands 2: It's a family affair 
 We Are Not White Lesbians, a collection of comics about Nia King and her boyfriend, a transgender man

References

External links
Nia King's website
Zines in Third Space: Radical Cooperation and Borderlands Rhetoric (2012) by Adela C. Licona 

Year of birth missing (living people)
Activists from Boston
American people of Hungarian descent
American people of Lebanese descent
Living people
Mills College alumni
American LGBT artists
LGBT African Americans
LGBT people from Massachusetts
American women podcasters
American podcasters
21st-century American women